Jacob Aagaard (born 31 July 1973) is a Danish-Scottish chess grandmaster and the 2007 British Chess Champion. He is Scotland's third-highest rated player as of July 2021, with an Elo rating of 2477. His peak rating was 2542. In 2004, he took second place in the Scottish Chess Championship. In 2005, he took first place in the Scottish Championship but was not a British citizen, so the title went to Craig Pritchett. In 2012 he won the title; the first time he played and was eligible to win it. He is also a chess author and co-owner of Quality Chess, a chess publishing house.

In 2011, Aagaard was awarded the title of FIDE Senior Trainer.

In 2012, Aagaard won the Scottish Chess Championships with a score of 7/9.

Aagaard is the only chess writer in the world to win all four major Book of the Year awards: English Chess Federation (2010), ChessCafe.com (2001), Association of Chess Professionals (2013) and the Boleslavsky Medal from FIDE's trainer committee (2012).

Bibliography

Notable games
Jacob Aagaard vs Per Arnt Rasmussen, 1996, King's Gambit: Accepted, Kieseritzky Gambit Kolisch Defense (C39), 1-0

References

External links

Interview With 94th British Champion GM Jacob Aagaard
Jacob Aagaard's Blog

1973 births
Living people
Chess grandmasters
Scottish chess players
Danish chess players
British chess writers
Scottish non-fiction writers
Danish emigrants to Scotland
British male writers
Male non-fiction writers